The Jamaican skink (Spondylurus fulgidus) is a species of skink found in Jamaica.

References

Spondylurus
Reptiles described in 1862
Reptiles of the Caribbean
Endemic fauna of the Caribbean
Taxa named by Edward Drinker Cope